Haze'evot (translation: The She-Wolves) is an Israeli rock band. The band members are Yifat Balassiano, Or Zigelbaum, Rony Shefer and Talia Ishai. The band's songs dub the female point of view on different social issues such as relationships, sexual harassment and sex, a voice uncommon which is seldom heard in the mostly male-dominated Israeli music scene.

Early years 
In the 2000s, the four original members of the band met in highschool in the town of Holon, Israel and began to play music together.

Their early rehearsals took place at the conservatory in Holon after hours. The custodian, Ze'ev, promised to keep it a secret, under the condition that the band would be named after him.

2012-present 

In 2012, the band released its first mini-album under the musical production of Yehu Yaron.

In 2015, the band went back to the studio with musical producer Nadav Perser and recorded its second album which was released in May of that year.

In 2016, management at Bar-Ilan University informed the band that they cannot sing during a Holocaust Memorial Day ceremony.

Haze'evot tour Israel non-stop and in October 2016 went on their first European tour and performed at the Waves festival in Vienna.

In August 2017, upon news that bass player, Moran Lachmi, was out to pursue a career in New York, the band welcomed Talia Ishai as its new bass player.

In May 2018, Rony Shefer replaced Shiran Franco on drums and in August and September 2018 the group set out on their second European tour, performing in Czech Republic, Germany, the Netherlands, Belgium, and France.

On January 30, 2021, the band officially announced the departure of original member Moran Saranga, also known as "Moris", and welcomed Or Zigelbaum who replaced her on guitar.

Musical influences 
The band is mainly influenced by sounds from the 1990s and plays original material both in Hebrew and English.

The band has noted Placebo, The Pixies, Radiohead, David Bowie, The Beatles, The Kooks, Sonic Youth, The Killers and Blur as their musical influences.

Discography

Adamot Yeveshot - 1st EP

Haze'evot - 2nd EP

Haaretz HaShtucha (The Flat Earth) - Studio Album

External links

References 

Israeli rock music groups
Israeli girl groups
Musical groups from Tel Aviv
All-female bands
Musical groups established in 2012
2012 establishments in Israel